Kyle Bell (born June 16, 1985) is a former running back. Kyle was born in Keenesburg, Colorado on June 16, 1985. He played fullback for the Colorado State Rams from 2004-2008. He was signed as an undrafted free agent by the Jacksonville Jaguars on April 26, 2009 after the 2009 NFL Draft.

Bell was waived by the Jacksonville Jaguars on June 23, 2009.

Media career
Bell moved back to Denver from Vail in January 2011 to pursue a sports media career. He is a regular contributor to Denver Magazine's SportsBook blog.

External links
Jacksonville Jaguars Bio
http://www.kffl.com/player/21253/NFL
Denver Magazine SportsBook blog

1985 births
Living people
People from Weld County, Colorado
Players of American football from Colorado
American football fullbacks
Colorado State University alumni
Colorado State Rams football players
Jacksonville Jaguars players